Myles Lorenz Garrett (born December 29, 1995) is an American football defensive end for the Cleveland Browns of the National Football League (NFL). He played college football at Texas A&M, where he received unanimous All-American honors in 2016, and was selected first overall by the Browns in the 2017 NFL Draft. Garrett has been named to four Pro Bowls and two first-team All-Pros during his NFL career.

High school career
Garrett attended Martin High School in Arlington, Texas, where he was a letterman in football, basketball, and track. In football, he had 19.5 sacks as a senior and was the 2013 recipient of the Landry Award, given to the top high school player in the Dallas-Fort Worth metroplex. Garrett was rated as a five-star recruit by the Rivals.com recruiting network and was ranked as the second best overall player in his class. He committed to play college football at Texas A&M University in October 2013. In track & field, he was a state qualifier in the throwing events, with top-throws of 16.01 meters in the shot put and 50.84 meters in the discus throw.

College career

Freshman year
Garrett came to Texas A&M as the #2 overall prospect in the nation. As a true freshman in 2014, Garrett broke Texas A&M's freshman sack record of 5.5 in only six games. In only nine games, he broke Jadeveon Clowney's SEC freshman sack record of eight. Garrett finished the season with 11.5 sacks (second in the SEC), 53 total tackles, 14 tackles for loss, 10 quarterback hurries, and a blocked kick (which teammate Deshazor Everett returned for a touchdown against Auburn). He was a consensus Freshman All-American and Freshman All-SEC selection. After the conclusion of the season, Garrett announced that he would undergo surgery to repair torn ligaments in his hand, an injury that occurred in the sixth game of the season, against Mississippi State.

Sophomore year
Garrett followed up his stellar freshman campaign by leading the SEC with 12 sacks as a sophomore. He recorded 57 total tackles (36 solo), 18.5 tackles for loss, seven quarterback hurries, five forced fumbles, and a blocked punt (which came against Alabama). In addition, Garrett recorded his first interception, off  his own-tipped ball, in the game against Ole Miss. The season earned Garrett a first-team All-American selection by the Walter Camp Football Foundation and the Football Writers Association of America. Garrett was also the Bill Willis Award winner as the top defensive lineman.

Junior year
Garrett's junior year found him limited by injuries. He suffered a high-ankle sprain to his left leg in the fourth game of the season against Arkansas, and did not appear in the games against South Carolina and New Mexico State. Garrett also found his availability limited to third downs in some other games while he recovered from the injury. For the season, Garrett recorded 8.5 sacks, 32 total tackles (18 of them solo), 15.0 tackles for loss, 10 quarterback hurries, two forced fumbles, and a pass breakup. The season resulted in Garrett earning a Unanimous Consensus All-American designation by being voted to the first-team by the Walter Camp Football Foundation, the Football Writers Association of America, the American Football Coaches Association, The Sporting News, the Associated Press, Fox Sports, Pro Football Focus, and SB Nation.

On December 31, 2016, Garrett officially declared his intention to enter the 2017 NFL Draft.

Statistics

Professional career
On December 31, 2016, Garrett announced his decision to forgo his remaining eligibility and enter the 2017 NFL Draft. He was projected to be a top ten selection and was ranked No. 1 on ESPN analyst Mel Kiper Jr.’s big board. Garrett attended the NFL Scouting Combine in Indianapolis and completed the majority of combine drills, but opted to skip the three-cone drill and short shuttle. Garrett solidified his position as a top ten pick with an impressive combine performance. His 41” vertical jump was the top performance of all defensive linemen and he also finished with the second best performance in the bench press and  broad jump. Garrett also had the third fastest 40-yard dash of all defensive linemen at the combine, which highly impressed scouts due to his size. On March 30, 2017, Garrett attended Texas A&M's Pro Day and chose to perform the 40-yard dash (4.65s), 20-yard dash (2.71), 10-yard dash (1.57s), and broad jump (10’6”).

Garrett attended pre-draft visits with the Jacksonville Jaguars, San Francisco 49ers, and Chicago Bears. At the conclusion of pre-draft process, Garrett was projected by NFL draft analyst and scouts to be the first overall player selected. He was ranked the top overall prospect and defensive end by Sports Illustrated, ESPN, Pro Football Focus, and DraftScout.com. Garrett was also ranked the top edge rusher in the draft by NFL analyst Mike Mayock.

2017

The Cleveland Browns selected Garrett with the first overall pick of the 2017 NFL Draft. Garrett became the highest draft pick from Texas A&M in the history of the NFL draft.

On May 19, 2017, the Cleveland Browns signed Garrett to a fully guaranteed four-year, $30.41 million contract that features a $20.25 million signing bonus, offset language options, and a team option for a fifth year.

Garrett entered training camp slated as a starting defensive end. Head coach Hue Jackson named Garrett and Emmanuel Ogbah the starting defensive ends to begin the regular season. They started the season alongside defensive tackles Trevon Coley and Jamie Meder.

On September 7, Garrett suffered a high ankle sprain during practice, causing him to miss the start of the season. After missing the first four games, Garrett played his first regular season game on October 8 against the New York Jets, and sacked Josh McCown twice, including once on his first ever NFL play. The Browns lost to the Jets  17–14. Despite having four sacks in his first three games, Garrett's injury woes continued as he suffered a concussion during Week 8 against the Tennessee Titans. Because he was on concussion protocol, he could not travel to London for the next game.

Overall, Garrett recorded 31 combined tackles (19 solo), seven sacks, one forced fumble, one pass defensed, and one fumble recovery during his rookie season. Due to injury he only played 11 of 16 games, but still finished first on the team in sacks.

2018

Garrett was named a defensive captain for the 2018 season. 
In week 1 against the Pittsburgh Steelers, Garrett sacked Ben Roethlisberger twice and forced two fumbles, both of which were recovered by the Browns, during the 21–21 tie game.
In week 3 against the New York Jets, Garrett sacked rookie quarterback Sam Darnold twice during the 21–17 win.
In week 7 against the Tampa Bay Buccaneers, Garrett sacked Jameis Winston twice during the 26–23 overtime loss.

In the 2018 season, Garrett started all 16 games and recorded 13.5 sacks, 44 combined tackles, 12 tackles-for-loss, 29 quarterback hits, three passes defensed, and three forced fumbles. His 13.5 sacks ranked sixth in the NFL that year. He was ranked 49th by his fellow players on the NFL Top 100 Players of 2019.

2019
In Week 1 against the Tennessee Titans, Garrett sacked Marcus Mariota twice in the 43–13 loss. During Week 2 against the New York Jets, Garrett finished with three sacks but also committed two roughing the passer penalties as the Browns won 23–3. On September 28, Garrett was fined a combined $52,639 for three fouls, a face mask hit on Delanie Walker as well as the two roughing the passer fouls on Trevor Siemian, the second of which resulted in Siemian tearing his anterior cruciate ligament (ACL) and putting him on injured reserve.
In week 6 against the Seattle Seahawks, Garrett sacked Russell Wilson twice in the 32–28 loss.

Brawl with Mason Rudolph

During Week 11 against the Pittsburgh Steelers, with eight seconds left in regulation, Garrett pulled Steelers quarterback Mason Rudolph to the ground following a late hit. Upset by the late hit, Rudolph started to attack Garrett by kicking him in the groin and attempting to pull off Garrett's helmet. After getting back up, Garrett forcibly removed Rudolph’s helmet as Steelers offensive linemen Maurkice Pouncey and David DeCastro tried to hold back Garrett. Garrett then violently swung Rudolph's own helmet at him, striking him in the head with the underside of the helmet. A fight ensued that resulted in Garrett, Pouncey, and Browns defensive tackle Larry Ogunjobi being ejected; Pouncey punched and kicked Garrett's head several times after the strike, while Ogunjobi pushed a helmetless Rudolph to the ground as he stood watching the fight.

Garrett's actions were called into question by his head coach and quarterback in interviews conducted immediately after the game. Browns quarterback Baker Mayfield called Garrett's action "inexcusable," while then Browns head coach Freddie Kitchens expressed embarrassment. Garrett later apologized for his actions, which he described as "foolish" and "out of character," while at the same time thanking those players who "backed him up." The next day, the NFL suspended Garrett indefinitely, and at a minimum for the remainder of the 2019 season. He was also fined $45,623 while Rudolph was fined $50,000. Thirty-three other players were fined $3,000 for entering a fight zone, and the Browns and Steelers organizations were fined $250,000 each. Garrett appealed his suspension on November 20, but the suspension was upheld.

Garrett was required to meet with officials from Commissioner Roger Goodell's office before being reinstated for the 2020 season. Months later, before his reinstatement hearing, Garrett alleged for the first time publicly that Rudolph directed a “racial slur” at him. Garrett claimed he discussed the alleged slur immediately after the altercation with former GM John Dorsey, head coach Freddie Kitchens, and Ogunjobi, his best friend. An investigation found no evidence to support his claim. Garrett's suspension was the second-longest suspension in NFL history for on-field misconduct, and the longest for a single in-game incident. (Raiders linebacker Vontaze Burfict was suspended for 12 games in 2019 due to a history of violations of player safety rules.)

2020
Garrett was reinstated from his suspension on February 12, 2020. On April 27, 2020, the Browns exercised the fifth-year option on Garrett's contract. He signed a five-year, $125 million contract extension with the team on July 15, 2020.
In Week 2 against the Cincinnati Bengals, Garrett recorded a strip sack on rookie quarterback Joe Burrow which was recovered by the Browns during the 35–30 win.
In Week 3 against the Washington Football Team, Garrett sacked Dwayne Haskins twice, including a strip sack that was recovered by himself during the 34–20 win. In a Week 4 game against the Dallas Cowboys, Garrett sacked Dak Prescott twice, one of which was a strip sack that resulted in a turnover, during the 49–38 win. His performance earned him AFC Defensive Player of the Week.
In Week 7 against the Cincinnati Bengals, Garrett sacked Joe Burrow two more times and forced a fumble that was recovered by the Browns during the 37–34 win.
As the month closed, Garrett won AFC Defensive Player of the Month for October after compiling six sacks, 14 tackles, four for a loss, and two forced fumbles. On November 20, 2020, Garrett was placed on the reserve/COVID-19 list missing the Browns Week 11 game against the Philadelphia Eagles. Garrett was activated from the reserve/COVID-19 list on December 1, 2020.

Garrett was selected for the 2020 NFL All-Pro Team, along with three of his teammates: tackle Jack Conklin and guards Joel Bitonio and Wyatt Teller.

2021
In Week 3 against the Chicago Bears, Garrett recorded 4.5 sacks against Bears rookie quarterback Justin Fields. He broke the franchise record for most sacks in a single game, previously held by Andra Davis. The Browns would go on to win 26–6. His performance earned him AFC Defensive Player of the Week.  In a Week 12 game against the Baltimore Ravens, Garrett sacked Lamar Jackson for his 14th sack of the season. That tied the most sacks in a season by a Cleveland Brown. The record was previously held by Reggie Camp. In a Week 14 game against the Baltimore Ravens, Garrett strip sacked Tyler Huntley, recovered the fumbled ball and returned it for his first NFL touchdown. This was his 15th sack of the season, breaking the Browns record for most sacks in a single season previously held by Reggie Camp. This record was broken in the first 13 games of a 17 game regular season.

During Week 14, Garrett became the first Cleveland Browns player to receive a 99 rating in the Madden NFL video game, specifically in Madden NFL 22.

Garrett had an extremely productive season, posting 16 sacks and 51 tackles, both career highs. He was named a starter in the 2022 Pro Bowl, as well as earning a 1st-team selection on the 2021 All-Pro Team.

NFL career statistics

Regular season

Postseason

Personal life
Garrett's half-brother, Sean Williams, was a standout basketball player for Boston College and was selected number 17 in the first round of the 2007 NBA draft by the New Jersey Nets. He then played in the NBA from 2007 to 2012. Brea Garrett, his older sister, was a track and field athlete at Texas A&M. She won the 2014 NCAA title in the 20-pound weight throw, and is the first weight throw champion in Aggie history.

During the 2015 offseason, Garrett decided to stop using his social media account on Twitter, citing: "There's a lot of negativity on there I don’t need in my life. I felt like If I want to move forward as a person and as a football player, I don’t need other people's opinions and other things to stick with me or be in my mind when I have other things to keep doing." Garrett later resumed using Twitter regularly. Garrett also writes poetry and is working on a dinosaur book for children.

On April 30, 2017, two days after the 2017 NFL Draft, Garrett, along with fellow first rounders Jabrill Peppers and David Njoku, were at Progressive Field, and threw out a ceremonial first pitch.

On September 26, 2022, Garrett was involved in a one-car crash leaving the team facility. The incident occurred near Wadsworth, Ohio.  He suffered minor injuries and was released from the hospital the same day.

References

External links

 Cleveland Browns profile
 Texas A&M profile
 

1995 births
Living people
American football defensive ends
Cleveland Browns players
Texas A&M Aggies football players
All-American college football players
African-American players of American football
Sportspeople from Arlington, Texas
Players of American football from Texas
National Football League first-overall draft picks
21st-century African-American sportspeople
American Conference Pro Bowl players